Boltonia is a genus of plants in the family Asteraceae native primarily to North America with one species in eastern Asia.

 Species
 Boltonia apalachicolensis - Apalachicola doll's daisy - Florida Panhandle
 Boltonia asteroides - white doll's daisy - USA (primarily Great Plains + Mississippi Valley, w scattered locations in eastern + northwestern US); Saskatchewan, Manitoba
 Boltonia caroliniana - Carolina doll's daisy - North + South Carolina, Georgia, Virginia
 Boltonia decurrens - claspingleaf doll's daisy, decurrent false aster - Illinois, Missouri, Iowa
 Boltonia diffusa - smallhead doll's daisy -  United States (Southeast + Lower Mississippi Valley)
 Boltonia lautureana - Japan, Korea, China, Russia (Primorye, Khabarovsk, Amur Oblast, Irkutsk, Zabaykalsky Krai)
 Boltonia montana - Pennsylvania, New Jersey, Virginia

References

Asteraceae genera
Astereae